American singer Lauren Jauregui has received several awards and nominations. As a member of the girl group Fifth Harmony, Jauregui received multiple awards including two BMI awards for "All in My Head (Flex)" from their album 7/27. In 2017, Jauregui received the Celebrity of the Year award at the British LGBT Awards in recognition of promoting equality for LGBTQ. Jauregui featured on Halsey's "Strangers", deemed by Billboard a "long-overdue bisexual milestone in mainstream music." In 2018, she received a Teen Choice Award for Choice Electronic/Dance Song for "All Night" with Steve Aoki. Jauregui also has received an iHeartRadio Music Award nomination for Best Solo Breakout and won the Teen Choice Award for Choice Song: Female Artist for "Expectations".

Awards and nominations

Notes

References

Jauregui, Lauren